Crawford railway station was a station which served the village of Crawford, near Abington, in the Scottish county of South Lanarkshire. It was served by local trains on what is now known as the West Coast Main Line.

History
Opened by the Caledonian Railway, it became part of the London Midland and Scottish Railway during the Grouping of 1923. It was closed by British Railways.

Accidents and incidents
On 2 April 1909, a passenger train became divided and was derailed due to the failure of the crank axle on the locomotive hauling it. A few passengers suffered minor injuries.

The site today
Trains pass at speed on the electrified West Coast Main Line but there is no station at the site now.

References

Notes

Sources 
 

 
 
 Crawford station on navigable OS map

Disused railway stations in South Lanarkshire
Railway stations in Great Britain opened in 1891
Railway stations in Great Britain closed in 1965
Beeching closures in Scotland
Former Caledonian Railway stations
1891 establishments in Scotland
1965 disestablishments in Scotland